Carmela Grippa is an Italian politician. She was elected to be a deputy to the Parliament of Italy in the 2018 Italian general election for the Legislature XVIII of Italy.

Career
Grippa was born on January 18, 1973, in Lucera.

She was elected to the Italian Parliament in the 2018 Italian general election, to represent the district of Abruzzo for Five Star Movement.

References

Living people
21st-century Italian women politicians
Five Star Movement politicians
1973 births
People from Lucera
20th-century Italian women